Alocasia augustiana,  is a species of Alocasia found in New Guinea.

References

External links
 
 

augustiana